Vladimir Semyonovich Slepak (29 October 1927 – 24 April 2015) was a Soviet dissident, refusenik, member of the Moscow Helsinki Group. Along with his wife Mariya Slepak (née Rashkovskaya) and sons Alexander and Leonid he fought for the right of Jews to emigrate from the Soviet Union.

He participated in the compilation of about 70 documents, appeals by Moscow Helsinki Group.

He graduated from the Moscow Aviation Institute as a radio engineer.

He lived and worked in Moscow as the head of the laboratory at the Research Institute of television in Golyanovo District and trust "Spetsgeofizika."

For his human rights activities he was convicted and exiled to the village of Tsokto-Khangil, Agin-Buryat Autonomous Okrug in the Chita Oblast from 1978 to 1983.

He spent nearly five years in Siberian exile for unfurling a banner that read, "Let Us Go..." Subsequently, he emigrated in October 1987 after 17 years has passed since his first application to the Visa Office. He lived with his family in Kfar Saba, Israel.

Books

References

1927 births
2015 deaths
Engineers from Moscow
Moscow Aviation Institute alumni
Soviet Jews
Russian Jews
Moscow Helsinki Group
Jewish human rights activists
Refuseniks
Soviet dissidents
Soviet human rights activists
Soviet prisoners and detainees
Soviet emigrants to Israel